Mohammadabad (also Romanized as Moḩammadābād) is a village in Qaleh Rural District, in the Central District of Manujan County, Kerman Province, Iran. At the 2006 census, its population was 1,132, in 202 families.

References 

Populated places in Manujan County